The Chronicles of Narnia is a British BBC-produced television serial that was aired from 13 November 1988 to 23 December 1990 and is based on four books of C. S. Lewis's The Chronicles of Narnia series. The first series aired was The Lion, the Witch and the Wardrobe in 1988, the second series aired was Prince Caspian and The Voyage of the Dawn Treader in 1989 and the third series aired was The Silver Chair in 1990. This television serial was produced by Paul Stone, with the teleplay by Alan Seymour. The Lion, the Witch, and the Wardrobe was directed by Marilyn Fox, while Prince Caspian, The Voyage of the Dawn Treader and The Silver Chair were directed by Alex Kirby.

Plot

The Lion, the Witch and the Wardrobe

Peter, Susan, Edmund and Lucy Pevensie are siblings who are evacuated from London because of the air raids in World War II. Soon after arriving at their temporary home, the four children discover that a wardrobe in a spare room contains a portal to the magical land of Narnia. There, they become involved in a war against the White Witch, and help restore the true ruler, a lion called Aslan, serving as kings and queens under him for many years before returning to their own world through the wardrobe.

Prince Caspian and the Voyage of the Dawn Treader

The four Pevensie children are waiting at a train station when a magical force pulls them back into Narnia, where they help Prince Caspian overthrow his evil uncle, King Miraz, and take the throne.

Back in England, Edmund and Lucy visit their cousin Eustace Scrubb. All three are sucked into a painting of Prince Caspian's ship, the Dawn Treader. Caspian, who has grown into a young man since they last saw him, explains that he is on a quest to find seven lords who were friends of his late father. The quest requires them to sail through dangerous waters, encountering new islands where things are not what they seem, and finally to sail to the end of the world.

The Silver Chair

Eustace Scrubb, cousin of the Pevensies, is at a boarding school with a girl named Jill Pole. While running away from bullies, they pass through a doorway into Aslan's country. Eustace accidentally falls off a cliff, but is blown to Narnia. Alone, Jill encounters Aslan, who explains that in Narnia, King Caspian's only son and heir, Prince Rilian, disappeared some years earlier. Jill is told to memorise four signs that will lead her and Eustace to Rilian. Aslan sends Jill to Narnia, where she is reunited with Eustace near the castle of Cair Paravel and the two follow the four signs as they search for the lost prince. They finally rescue Rilian and return to Narnia with him shortly before the elderly Caspian dies.

Cast

Awards
The series were nominated for a total of 16 awards, including a nomination for an Emmy in the category of "Outstanding Children's Program". The series won the BAFTA Award for "Best Video Lighting" (1988), and was nominated for "Best Children's Programme (Entertainment / Drama)" (1988, 1989, 1990), "Best Video Lighting" (1989, 1990), "Best Make Up" (1988, 1989, 1990), "Best Costume Design" (1988, 1989), "Best Design" (1989, 1990), and "Best Video Cameraman" (1989, 1990).

Home video releases 

The series has been released in various formats:

 VHS
 1990 Box set 
 DVD
 2002 Box set 
 2005 Box set Complete collectors edition (Cat. No. BBCDVD1889) 
 2015 Box set BBC – The Chronicles of Narnia 

In Australia the first DVD release was 1 October 2005 as the 'Collector's Edition' Box Set which was a fold out package with 4 discs. Features Behind the scenes, Narnia trivia and more. There have been several later issues.

See also 

 Outline of Narnia

References

External links
 
 
 
 The Chronicles of Narnia at ClassicKidsTV.co.uk
 

TV 1987
BBC children's television shows
1988 British television series debuts
1990 British television series endings
1980s British children's television series
1990s British children's television series
British fantasy television series
Television series by BBC Studios
British television shows based on children's books
British television shows featuring puppetry
Witchcraft in television